Michael Soltis (born October 25, 1971) is an American actor and artist living in Vancouver, British Columbia, Canada.

Early life and education 
Born in Minot, North Dakota and raised in the state of Washington, he earned a Bachelor of Arts degree in communication from Seattle Pacific University and a Master of Education in adult education administration from Western Washington University. He later earned a certificate in acting from the Vancouver Film School.

Career 
Soltis first gained recognition starring in the Steven Spielberg mini-series, Taken as Lt. Pierce opposite Dakota Fanning. He has also appeared in the feature films, X2 and Walking Tall (2004) starring Dwayne Johnson. He has been featured in various television series including, Smallville, The L Word, Battlestar Galactica, and Stargate SG-1. In 2012, he co-starred in the independent feature film With Child and had roles in the ABC hit TV series Once Upon a Time as well as two J. J. Abrams projects, Alcatraz, and the finale episode of the Fox television series Fringe.

Soltis is also an award-winning visual artist whose work is held in private collections in Canada, the United States and Europe. He once owned the Stark + Kent Gallery, an art gallery in Palm Springs, California.

Filmography

Film

Television

References

External links

1971 births
Living people
American emigrants to Canada
Canadian male television actors
Male actors from North Dakota
Male actors from Vancouver
People from Minot, North Dakota